"My Baby" is the first single by American rapper Lil' Romeo from his debut studio album Lil' Romeo by No Limit Records. The song features Ms Peaches and samples "I Want You Back" by The Jackson 5. It topped the Billboard R&B chart and reached number 3 on the Billboard Hot 100, and is, to date, Romeo's biggest hit. It was featured in the video game Thrillville: Off the Rails.

Music video
The music video for the song depicts Lil' Romeo being chased by fans throughout a mall. The video ends with Romeo escaping the crowd of fans after being picked up in a helicopter by Master P and Silkk the Shocker.

Lyrics
In "My Baby", Lil' Romeo rapped, "After high school, I'm going straight to the pros." In 2004, the Orlando Sentinel referred to that lyric in an article about Romeo playing basketball at Beverly Hills High School. Romeo accepted a full athletic scholarship to the University of Southern California in 2008. Romeo played for two seasons with the USC Trojans men's basketball team.

Track listing

Europe 12"
 A1. "My Baby" (Radio) – 3:42
 A2. "My Baby" (Instrumental) – 3:39
 B1. "My Baby" (Club Mix) – 3:42
 B2. "My Baby" (A Cappella) – 3:30
Europe CD maxi-single
 1. "My Baby" (Radio) – 3:42
 2. "My Baby" (Club Mix) – 3:30
 3. "My Baby" (Instrumental) – 3:39
Europe CD (Promo)
 1. "My Baby" (Radio) – 3:42
 2. "My Baby" (Club Mix) – 3:30

UK CD (Enhanced)
 1. "My Baby" (Radio) – 3:42
 2. "My Baby" (Club Mix) – 3:30
 3. "That's Cool" (Remix) – 3:56
 4. "My Baby" (Video)
US 12" (Promo)
 A1. "My Baby" (Radio) – 3:42
 A2. "My Baby" (Instrumental) – 3:39
 B1. "My Baby" (A Cappella) – 3:42
 B2. "My Baby" (Club Mix) – 3:30
US CD (Promo)
 1. "My Baby" (Radio Version) – 3:45
 2. "My Baby" (Instrumental Version) – 3:42
 3. "My Baby" (A Cappella Version) – 3:44
 4. "My Baby" (Club Mix) – 3:29

Charts

Weekly charts

Year-end charts

See also
 List of number-one R&B singles of 2001 (U.S.)
 List of Billboard number-one rap singles of the 2000s

References

2001 songs
2001 debut singles
Romeo Miller songs
Songs written by Berry Gordy
Songs written by Alphonzo Mizell
Songs written by Freddie Perren